Sheep on Drugs are a British techno/industrial music group, formed by Duncan X ( King Duncan) (vocals) and Lee Fraser (a.k.a. Dead Lee) (guitar/keyboards), and currently composed of Fraser and Johnny Borden (vocals/keyboards).

Biography
Duncan and Fraser met in 1988 and conceived of Sheep On Drugs while ruminating on the potential direction of the burgeoning acid house scene of the late 1980s. Fraser had played various instruments in bands since he was 14 and had experimented with sampling prior to meeting Duncan, but together they were inspired to create electronic music with a more energetic stage presence.

Originally classified as part of the rave movement, the duo emerged in the early 1990s with a string of singles, including "Motorbike", "15 Minutes of Fame" and "Track X" (later covered by Grace Jones as "Sex Drive"). "15 Minutes of Fame" reached the lower reaches of the UK Singles Chart. "From A to H and Back Again" spent 12 weeks on the CMJ RPM Charts, peaking at #4, and hit #40 on the UK Singles Chart.

Their Gareth Jones-produced debut album, Greatest Hits, was released on Island Records in 1993 to some acclaim from the UK music press and a peak position of 55 on the UK Albums Chart. However, with their Grand Guignol style stage shows, and a musical mixture of sleazy rock, hard techno and punk nihilism, SoD found themselves pigeonholed as an industrial band. Their 1994 follow-up album, ...On Drugs was a commercial and critical disappointment.

"For the 'On Drugs' album, it was basically me and Duncan locked in a room, with no guidance about what direction we were to take it in, no producer. Markus Dravs, who did the production for that album, he's a brilliant artist in his own right, but he wasn't the producer we needed. He was just brought into the studio to mix, it wasn't like he was an active part of the team, so they fucked that up. So, no wonder the second album wasn't as commercial as they were expecting, because they didn't give us any guidance" according to Lee.

After being dropped by Island, the band independently released two EPs: Suck in 1994 and Strapped for Cash in 1995. The band was then signed to Martin Atkins' Invisible Records and headed to the United States. With Invisible, they released the two EPs as Double Trouble in 1996, their third studio album, One for the Money and a remix collection, Never Mind the Methadone in 1997, and a live recording, Two for the Show in 1998. By this time, they had tired of their situation in the States and were unsatisfied with Invisible. Frontman Duncan X departed Sheep on Drugs shortly afterwards to become a professional tattooist (though he does perform live with the band on rare occasions). Fraser continued his relationship with Invisible Records, releasing two more albums as "Bagman", and was briefly a member of Atkins' bands Pigface and The Damage Manual, usually under the moniker "Lee 303". Fraser revived the group in 2002, with himself as the frontman, and released a new album, F**K, on Invisible in 2005. A best-of compilation album called Best of a Bad Bunch was released in 2006.

After the release of F**K, Lee Fraser met and began working with Johnny Borden, herself a singer and musician working within similar circles. Johnny was soon brought on board as Lee's partner in Sheep on Drugs' new 21st century incarnation and they began gigging, developing new material which was released on their new album Medication Time (released digitally on 6 December 2010). The album was to be released by a French record label on physical CDs in 2011 to accompany a tour in February.

Club Meds, an album of remixes of tracks from Medication Time, followed in 2012. Borden and Fraser continued to perform live until their self-released album Does Dark Matter on vinyl and download formats in 2019. This album sees an orthogonal shift in Sheep On Drugs' sound with melodic and dub sounds. A cassette EP of remixes, 2 light 2 dark, followed in late 2019. During the lockdown caused by the COVID-19 pandemic, Borden and Fraser managed to release a single, "Moonlight Man".

Discography

Albums
 Greatest Hits (Island, 1993)
 ...On Drugs (Island, 1994)
 Double Trouble (Invisible, 1996) - compilation and re-release of Drug Squad EPs.
 One for the Money (Invisible, 1997)
 Never Mind the Methadone (Invisible, 1997) - remixes
 Two for the Show (Invisible, 1998) - live
 F**K (Invisible, 2005)
 Best of a Bad Bunch (Underground, Inc., 2006) - compilation and remixes
 Medication Time (digital, 2010)
 Club Meds (Real Recordings, 2012)
  Does Dark Matter (Sheep on Drugs, 2019)

EPs
 From A to H and Back Again (Smash/Island, 1994)
 Strapped for Cash (Drug Squad, 1995)
 Suck (Drug Squad, 1995)
 2 Light 2 Dark {Sheep on Drugs, 2019}

Singles
 "Catch 22" / "Drug Music" (Transglobal, 1991)
 "Motorbike" / "Mary Jane" (Transglobal, 1992)
 "Track X" (Transglobal, 1992)
 "TV USA" (Transglobal, 1992)
 "15 Minutes of Fame" (Island, 1993)
 "Let the Good Times Roll" (Island, 1994)
 "Moonlight Man" [Sheep On Drugs 2020]

As Bagman (Lee Fraser solo)
 "Wrap" (Invisible, 1998)
 "Trax" (Underground, Inc., 2004)

Tribute Albums
 "Back in Black" (with Pigface) on Covered in Black: An Industrial Tribute to the Kings of High Voltage AC/DC (Cleopatra, 1997)
 "California über alles" on Dread Kennedys: A Tribute to Dead Kennedys / In Dub We Trust (Invisible, 1999)
 "Wish" on Covered in Nails: A Tribute to Nine Inch Nails (Cleopatra, 2000)
 "Money" on Don't Blow Your Cover: A Tribute to KMFDM (Cleopatra, 2000)

Soundtracks
 "Cathode Ray", "Uberman", and "15 Minutes of Fame" on The Young Americans (Island, 1993)
 "Machine Sex" on Prey (2K Games, 2006)

References

External links
The official Sheep on Drugs site
[ Sheep on Drugs] on Allmusic
Sheep on Drugs @ Invisible Records
Sheep on Drugs myspace page
bandcamp

Musical groups established in 1990
English techno music groups
English electronic music groups
English electronic rock musical groups
Dance-punk musical groups
Underground, Inc. artists
Rhythm King artists